In topology, a branch of mathematics, given a topological monoid X up to homotopy (in a nice way), an infinite loop space machine produces a group completion of X together with infinite loop space structure. For example, one can take X to be the classifying space of a symmetric monoidal category S; that is, . Then the machine produces the group completion . The space  may be described by the K-theory spectrum of S.

References 
May, The uniqueness of infinite loop space machine

Homotopy theory
Topological spaces
Topology